Kerala Football League (KFL) / Kerala State Football League was a league competition conducted by Kerala Football Association. Founded in 1998, the KFL was the first football league in Kerala.The KFL was stopped after 2007 season, later new league Kerala Premier League was started from 2013.

History 
After introduction of National Football League by All India Football Federation, Kerala Football Association started Kerala Football League in 1998. The team finishing top were nominated to 2nd division of National Football League.

1998 season
 FC Kochin  crowned the inaugural season and qualified next season final round ( super league)  SBT  finished in second place.

1999 season
The second edition of Kerala Football League held in Kochi and Kollam in December 1999.  FC Kochin  club retain the tille. SBT Trivandrum  become the runners up. 
 Kerala Football League -1999

Teams

Group A:
Central Excise Kochi, Kerala Police, FACT, KSEB.

Group B:
SBT, Titanium, Keltron.

2007 season 

Western Union Kerala State Football League  is the 7th and final edition of Kerala Football League (KFL). State Bank Travancore (SBT) won the title and Central Excise Kochi become runners up. Kerala Football League -2007 

Teams

Central Excise, Kochi , Kerala State Electricity Board (KSEB), State Bank of Travancore (SBT), Titanium XI , Kochin Port Trust , Viva Kerala .

Champions

References 

Football in Kerala